Steno may refer to: 

 Steno, Salamis, a small community at the northwest of Salamis Island, Greece
 Stenography, the process of writing in shorthand
 Stenotype, a specialized chorded keyboard or typewriter used by stenographers for shorthand use
 Stenographer or Stenotypist or Steno, a specialized person for using a Stenotype machine
 Steno-typist, a combination of typist and stenographer
 Stenotrophomonas maltophilia (Steno), a bacterium which causes uncommon, but difficult to treat, infections in humans
 Steno (genus), the monotypic genus of the rough-toothed dolphin
 Steno Diabetes Center, a research and teaching hospital in Gentofte, Denmark

Craters
 Steno (lunar crater)
 Steno (Martian crater)
 Steno-Apollo, a lunar crater originally named Steno

People
 Nicolas Steno (1638–1686), pioneer in anatomy and geology
 Stefano Vanzina (aka Steno) (1915–1988), Italian movie director

See also
 Sterno, a fuel made from jellied alcohol